Finlay Lockett (born Finlay Hurford-Lockett, 10 April 2003) is an English professional footballer who plays for Bolton Wanderers.

Career
At the age of 8, Lockett was signed as a youth player by Burnley after being scouted at Brazilian Soccer Schools, Tameside. On 10 August 2019, Lockett made his Bolton Wanderers debut as a second-half substitute in a 0–0 draw at home to Coventry City, in which Bolton fielded their youngest ever team, due to financial difficulties.

As of 2019, Lockett is the second youngest ever player to play a first team game for Bolton aged 16 years and 122 days, with only former England international Ray Parry having been younger at the age of his debut. He returned to the U-18 for the 20–21 season. He scored 19 goals and got 18 assists for the U-18 in the 2020–21 season, however on the final day of the season he injured his ACL which could see him miss the entire 2021–22 season. On 16 June he announced he had signed his first professional contract signing until June 2022. He returned from injury for the reserves on 29 March 2022 and on 2 May Bolton announced they had activated an option clause in his contract to extend it to an unspecified date. On 14 June, he signed a new contract.

On 26 August 2022, Lockett joined Northern Premier League Premier Division on a short-term loan agreement alongside his fellow young Trotter Arran Pettifer. He made his debut a day later as a substitute in a 1–0 defeat against Matlock Town. On 26 September, their loan were extended for another month. On 14 October, he was recalled from his loan.

Personal life
On 6 October 2020 it was revealed his name had been shortened from "Finlay Hurford-Lockett" to "Finlay Lockett".

Career statistics

Notes

References

2003 births
Living people
People from Marple, Greater Manchester
Association football midfielders
English footballers
Bolton Wanderers F.C. players
Atherton Collieries A.F.C. players
English Football League players
Northern Premier League players